Edgar Ramsay (born 20 October 1914) was a South African rower. He competed in the men's coxless four event at the 1948 Summer Olympics.

References

External links
 

1914 births
Year of death missing
South African male rowers
Olympic rowers of South Africa
Rowers at the 1948 Summer Olympics
Place of birth missing